Women Who Give is a 1924 American silent drama film directed by Reginald Barker. It starred Barbara Bedford, Renee Adoree and Frank Keenan. Based upon the novel Cape Cod Folk by Sarah P. MacLean, it was produced by Louis B. Mayer Productions and distributed by MGM.

Plot
As described in a film magazine review, stern Cape Cod businessman Jonathan Swift has high ambitions for his two children. To prevent a match between his son Noah and Becky, the daughter of Captain Bijonah Keeler, he sends aboard ship. Becky, fearing her approaching motherhood, runs away on Captain Joe Cradlebow's vessel. Captain Cradlebow is an unsuccessful suitor for Emily Swift's hand. The fishing fleet returns home in a terrible storm guided by the beacon light of Captain Keeler's blazing home, which he had set on fire. Noah weds Becky while Emily becomes the wife of Captain Cradlebow.

Cast

Preservation status
A print of Women Who Give survives in the MGM Studio library, Turner.

References

External links

Lantern slide (archived)
Still of a scene (archived)

1924 films
American silent feature films
Films directed by Reginald Barker
American black-and-white films
Silent American drama films
1924 drama films
1920s American films